Los Furios is a nine-piece band from Vancouver, British Columbia which has performed across Western Canada since 2000.  Los Furios began adding horns to the line-up in 2001 and have been evolving their blend of punk, ska, and reggae ever since.

The band has variously featured a two- or three-piece horn section complemented by distinct songwriters and vocalists.  This instrumentation adds to their diverse sound. Noticeable influences in their sound include acts such as The Clash, Sublime, Fishbone, and Rancid.  The 6-song EP Los Furios (Surrender Records 2003) was the first release to feature the horn driven sound people have come to associate with the band.

Their 2004 release Warning Shot (Megalith Records USA/Bacteria Buffet Records CDN) sold over 5000 copies, mostly at the live shows, and received rave reviews from college radio DJs across the country.  Warning Shot fully displays the diverse influences of the group, ranging from rocksteady reggae to so-cal punk & ska.

Some of their highlight gigs include two opening spots at The Commodore Ballroom (House of Blues), first with Fishbone and later with The Tokyo Ska Paradise Orchestra.  They have been invited to play the Victoria Ska Fest three years running, including a headlining spot on the 2005 bill with Fishbone and Long Beach Short Bus.  The Vans Warped Tour has also taken notice of the band, featuring them on their 2005 tour.

Other acts that have shared a stage with The Furios include Bedouin Soundclash, The Pietasters, Chris Murray, The Dreadnoughts, Monkey, The Planet Smashers, Flashlight Brown, The Toasters, Big D and The Kids Table, DOA, Mad Bomber Society, General Rudie, The Evaporators, The English Beat, and The Smugglers.

Band members
 Corinne – trombone, vocals
 Kyle – guitar, vocals
 Jethro – bass
 Blake - keyboards
 Sean – drums
 Jimmy – saxophone
 Mat – trumpet
 Stef- groupie
Gonzalo - percussion, vocals

Discography

References

External links

 Official Web Site
 Market Store
 Explanation for The vs. Los name change

Canadian punk rock groups
Musical groups established in 2000
Musical groups from Vancouver
2000 establishments in British Columbia